Victor Alvin Lombardi  (September 20, 1922 – December 3, 1997) was a pitcher in Major League Baseball. He pitched from 1945 to 1950 with the Brooklyn Dodgers and Pittsburgh Pirates. He was the starting pitcher in two games of the 1947 World Series for the Dodgers.

References

External links

Vic Lombardi at Baseball Almanac
Vic Lombardi at Baseball Library

1922 births
1997 deaths
Sportspeople from Fresno County, California
Major League Baseball pitchers
Brooklyn Dodgers players
Pittsburgh Pirates players
San Diego Padres (minor league) players
Baseball players from California
Johnstown Johnnies players
Santa Barbara Saints players
Durham Bulls players
Hollywood Stars players
Toronto Maple Leafs (International League) players
Seattle Rainiers players
Portland Beavers players
People from Reedley, California